Fred the Computer was launched in 1987 by the Middlesex News in Framingham, Massachusetts. A single-line BBS system, it was used to preview the next day's edition with news headlines and weather information. It was sometimes called Fred the Middlesex News Computer.

The original sysop for the system was Sharon Machlis, now an online editor at Computerworld, who built the system out of TBBS and a dual-floppy Leading Edge PC. Adam Gaffin (later editor of universalhub.com), took over after Machlis left and upgraded the system to a 286. Subscriptions from readers enabled him to purchase a 19.2k modem and a second phone line for the system. Later, Fred was used to organize and display the newspaper's archive of film reviews.

Along with 10 other members of the Associated Press, the Middlesex News in 1980 offered a digital text edition to CompuServe. The bulletin board service's subscribers could then, via dial-up, access News stories on their personal computers.

Dial-up newspapers
In 1987, when the Middlesex News debuted its own BBS, subscribers could dial into Fred and see the next day's headlines, submit press releases and write letters to the editor. This was one of the earliest online transmissions of news directly from a newspaper to its readers. Karen McKelvey's 1991 guide to dial-up libraries and newspapers lists only five: Fred the Computer, Newsday'''s Newsday Online, StarText (Fort Worth Star-Telegram), Omaha CityNet (Omaha World-Telegram) and the Electric Newspaper (Long Beach Press-Telegram).

In 1993, the Middlesex News set up a Gopher site, making it the first general-circulation United States newspaper on the Internet, offering daily headlines, movie reviews and restaurant reports. In 1998, the Middlesex News'' became the MetroWest Daily News which launched its online edition September 2001.

References

External links
Adam Gaffin at the Middlesex News
Commercial Online Newspaper Services (2/26/95)
Public Access to Library Catalogs

Bulletin board systems